The Witness is a French-Italian crime-thriller film written and directed by Jean-Pierre Mocky and starring Alberto Sordi and Philippe Noiret. It is loosely based on the novel Shadow of a Doubt by Harrison Judd.

Plot
Italian artist Antonio Berti is invited by his French friend Robert Maurisson to restore the paintings in the Reims Cathedral. He needs a model and selects Cathy, a teenage girl from the local church choir. Despite her angelic demeanor, the girl makes sexually explicit comments while posing for Antonio. One day, Cathy goes missing, and her dead body is later found in a canal, not far from an empty house owned by Maurisson. Antonio remembers seeing his friend Robert near the house on the night of the crime, but the latter denies it and has an alibi. Instead, the police turn their attention to Berti who is an outsider and can't provide an alibi. Later, Robert privately confesses to Antonio, and suggests they both would escape to a country that doesn't have capital punishment. Cathy's father then mistakenly assassinates Maurisson, who was driving Berti's car. Having lost the only person who could prove his innocence, Antonio is convicted and sentenced to death.

Cast 
Alberto Sordi as Antonio Berti
Philippe Noiret as Robert Maurisson
  as Inspector Guerin
 Gisèle Préville as Madame Louise Maurisson 
 Paul Crauchet as Cathy's father
  Madeleine Colin as Mrs. Valentine 
  Dany Bernard as Le chasseur 
  Sandra Dobrigna as Cathy Massis 
  Gérard Hoffman as Inspector's assistant
 Dominique Zardi as Moignard 
 Henri Attal as Le garde-chasse 
 Jean-Claude Remoleux as Le paysan
  Consuelo Ferrara as Hélène
Paul Müller as Le beau-frère de Maurisson

Production
Initially, the director Mocky chose Jean Gabin for the leading role, that of a piano teacher accused of murdering a young girl. The actor agreed but said he wanted Philippe Noiret to be his screen partner. Noiret agreed as well but Gabin died during the pre-production stage. Noiret suggested Alberto Sordi, in that case the film could be a co-production with Italy. The profession of the protagonist was changed to be an art restorer, and the production was moved to Rome though several scenes were filmed in and around Reims where the action takes place. Sordi's participation posed another problem—there is no capital punishment in Italy, and screenwriter Sergio Amidei had to find an acceptable ending for the Italian audiences. Thus two endings were created: Sordi's character is guillotined in the French version, and the Italian version only alludes to it, and shows flashbacks with a smiling Sordi having good times in Reims.

References

External links

1978 films
French crime thriller films
Italian crime thriller films
1970s crime thriller films
Films directed by Jean-Pierre Mocky
1970s French films
1970s Italian films